The Forum CentraleSupélec is an annual meeting that brings together companies and students from École Centrale Paris and Supélec. Taking place yearly at the  Palais des Congrès in the heart of Paris, it aims at giving the students a first perception of the career prospect offered by their diploma.

Over 3200 students participate every year to meet about 190 companies and several partner universities from all around the world. It remains one of the most important job fairs organised by French engineering schools (Grandes Écoles) and amongst the biggest in Europe.

Past activities
École Centrale Paris and Supélec are amongst the most prestigious engineering schools in France. They offer multidisciplinary curriculum for engineers, including scientific, engineering and management education. Since December 2008, a strategic alliance was announced between the two schools, known today through the common brand of CentraleSupélec.
The merge between the job fairs organized independently in each one of the schools (the Forum Centrale Entreprises and the Forum Supélec) was brought to fruition in 2010. Since then, it has given rise to three events at the Palais des Congrès.

International openness
Several international companies and partner foreign universities take part in the Forum Centrale-Supélec. It is an opportunity for companies to present their international careers and business activities to the students.

Since 2011 the Forum Centrale-Supélec has been part of the ECFA (European Career Forums Alliance), of which the Forum Centrale Entreprises was a founding member.

Key figures
The third edition of the Forum Centrale-Supélec has gathered 180 companies, including 86 École Centrale Paris or Supélec partners, and several CAC 40 firms. 16 universities contributed to the Forum, and one stand was occupied by the Administration of École Centrale Paris and Supélec in charge of international mobility.

Among the 3200 students who attended the Forum Centrale-Supélec in 2012, 75% were from École Centrale Paris or Supélec ; 15% were studying master's degree at either engineering school, 5% were researchers and the last 5% were alumni students.

In the day the Forum Centrale-Supélec takes place, about 90 students work on its organisation.

Provided services to students 
Three weeks before the Forum, each school organises training activities to prepare the students for the event. Members of human resources from participating companies are invited to help. Activities include lectures on how to write a CV, job interview simulation in French and English, case studies, brainteasers, etc.

Closing conference
The event concludes with a conference in the auditorium of the Palais des Congrès held by a CEO of a large European industrial company. The Forum Centrale-Supélec has welcomed:
 Mr. Gallois, ex-CEO of EADS, in 2010.
 Mr. Mestrallet, CEO of GDF Suez, in 2011. 
 Mr de Margerie, CEO of Total, in 2012.
 Mr. Herteman, CEO of Safran, in 2013.
 Mr. Lévy, CEO of Thales, in 2014.
 Mr. Oudéa, CEO of Société Générale, in 2015.

See also 
 École Centrale Paris  
 Supélec

Grandes écoles